The Royal and Prior School is a co-educational day and boarding school located in Raphoe, County Donegal, Ireland. It was one of a number of 'free schools' created by James I in 1608 to provide an education to the sons of local merchants and farmers during the plantation of Ulster. It has four 'sister' schools: The Royal School, Armagh in Armagh, The Enniskillen Royal Grammar School in Enniskillen, County Fermanagh, The Royal School Cavan in County Cavan, and The Royal School Dungannon in Dungannon, County Tyrone.

History
The Royal School, Donegal was one of the schools originally established as part of a plan to provide education for children of the settlers who had arrived with the Ulster Plantation. The original intention was to establish a school in the counties of Armagh, Tyrone, Londonderry, Fermanagh, Donegal and Cavan. The original school was built in Donegal Town but was relocated to Raphoe in 1661.

In 1971, the Royal School merged with the Prior School in Lifford which had been established in 1880. The newly amalgamated school, which was renamed The Royal and Prior School, was constructed just outside the town of Raphoe. It is now a mixed school which attracts students from throughout the county.

Notable alumni and staff

 Elydyr William Rogers Cookman (b. 1927) – school principal 
 George Simms  (1910–1991) –  Church of Ireland Archbishop of Armagh
 Canon David Crooks – Prebendary of Howth
 Mark Tighe – journalist and author
 Rachael Darragh (b. 1997) – badminton player

References

1608 establishments in Ireland
Educational institutions established in the 1600s
Raphoe
Boarding schools in Ireland
Schools with a royal charter